The Palace of El Infantado (Spanish: Palacio del Infantado) is a palace located in Guadalajara, Spain. An example of the Isabelline architectural style, it dates from the 15th century and was the seat of the Dukes of the Infantado.

Conservation and access 
The building has been protected by a heritage listing, currently Bien de Interés Cultural, since 1914, but was one of a number of buildings in Guadalajara which suffered damage in the Spanish Civil War. Since 1973, it houses the Museum of Guadalajara.

References 

Isabelline architecture
Bien de Interés Cultural landmarks in the Province of Guadalajara
Buildings and structures in Guadalajara, Spain
Palaces in Castilla–La Mancha